A Perfect Murder is a Canadian heavy metal band formed in Montreal in 2000.

History 
A Perfect Murder was formed in 2000 in Montreal, Quebec by Carl Bouchard. Their first EP, Blood Covered Words, was released the same year. In 2003, before the release of the band's first full-length album, Bouchard decided to switch from vocals to lead guitar.  Vocalist Frank Pellerin took over for Bouchard on 2003's Cease to Suffer. Later that year, the band signed with Victory Records. Still under contract to Cyclop Records, the band released the EP Rehearsal to fulfill their contract obligation. Their first full-length album for Victory was 2004's Unbroken. After the release of Unbroken, Pellerin left the band and was replaced by Tennessee native singer Kevin Randel to release 2005's Strength Through Vengeance. Less than one month after releasing their fourth full-length album, 2007's War of Aggression, the band decided to call it quits. The decision came after their tour support was pulled by Victory Records. They came back with the original line-up in 2009 to play some shows.

Discography 
Split with Burning Bridge – demo tape, 2001
Blood Covered Words – EP (2001)
3-song promo – promo CD (2003)
Cease to Suffer (2003)
Unbroken (2004)
Rehearsal – EP (2005)
Strength Through Vengeance (2005)
War of Aggression (2007)
Demonize (2013)

Band members 
 Frank Pellerin – vocals
 Carl Bouch – lead guitar
 Kevin Lemire – rhythm guitar
 Luc Verville – bass
 Yan Chaussé – drums

References

External links 

Musical groups established in 2000
Musical groups disestablished in 2007
Musical groups reestablished in 2009
Musical groups from Montreal
Canadian heavy metal musical groups
Victory Records artists
Canadian metalcore musical groups
Canadian thrash metal musical groups
Groove metal musical groups
Demons Run Amok Entertainment artists